Trinitramide is a compound of nitrogen and oxygen with the molecular formula N(NO2)3.  The compound was detected and described in 2010 by researchers at the Royal Institute of Technology (KTH) in Sweden. It is made of a nitrogen atom bonded to three nitro groups(-NO2).

Earlier, there had been speculation whether trinitramide could exist. Theoretical calculations by Montgomery and Michels in 1993 showed that the compound was likely to be stable.

Trinitramide has a potential use as one of the most efficient and least polluting of rocket propellant oxidizers, as it is chlorine-free.
This is potentially an important development, because the Tsiolkovsky rocket equation implies that even small improvements in specific impulse yields a similar change in delta-v, which can make large improvements in the size of practical rocket launch payloads.
The density impulse (impulse per volume) of a trinitramide based propellant could be 20 to 30 per cent better than most existing formulations, however the specific impulse (impulse per mass) of formulations with liquid oxygen is higher.

References

Nitrogen oxides
Rocket oxidizers
Spacecraft propulsion
Nitroamines